Peter Roger Shergold   is an Australian academic, company director, and former public servant. Shergold has been the Chancellor of Western Sydney University since 2011.

Between February 2003 and February 2008, he was the Secretary of the Department of the Prime Minister and Cabinet, and as such was the most senior official in the Australian Public Service.

Early life and education
Shergold was born in Crawley New Town, England.

He earned a Bachelor of Arts (first-class) in politics and American studies from the University of Hull, and later a Master of Arts degree in American history from the University of Illinois at Chicago Circle and a PhD  from the London School of Economics. After moving to Australia, he became a lecturer in economics at the University of New South Wales in 1972. He was appointed as head of the university's economic history department in 1985.  His dissertation in comparative labour history was published as Working-Class Life: The "American Standard" in Comparative Perspective, 1899–1913 in 1982.

Public service career

In 1987 he began working for the Australian federal government, firstly as head of the newly established Office of Multicultural Affairs.

Having become deputy secretary of the Department of the Prime Minister and Cabinet in 1990, he was appointed the CEO of the Aboriginal and Torres Strait Islander Commission (1991–1994) and Comcare, a federal government workers' compensation authority (1994–1995).

From 1995 to 1998, he was the Commissioner of the Australian Public Service. He has also been the Secretary of the Department of Employment, Workplace Relations and Small Business (1998–2001) and the Department of Education, Science and Training (2001–03). In 2003 he was appointed Secretary of the Department of the Prime Minister and Cabinet.

Academic and business career
After retiring from the Australian public service in February 2008, Shergold became the first head of The Centre for Social Impact, a joint collaboration between the business schools of the University of New South Wales, Melbourne Business School, Swinburne University of Technology and the University of Western Australia. In that capacity he was a frequent media commentator on the relationship between governments and not-for-profit organisations, new forms of social business and entrepreneurship and corporate responsibility and accountability. He co-hosted 'Social Business' on Sky News Business Channel.

From 2006–08, Shergold  served as the chairman of the Australia and New Zealand School of Government. He is currently a non-executive director of financial services company AMP Limited and Australian law firm Corrs Chambers Westgarth. He is chairman of Opal Aged Care, the National Centre for Vocational Education Research and the Australian Rural Leadership Foundation and serves on the boards of the General Sir John Monash Foundation and the National Centre of Indigenous Excellence. He chairs the ethics committee of the Fundraising Institute Australia.

In 2011 Shergold became the Chancellor of the University of Western Sydney; and was appointed as chairman of the New South Wales Public Service Commission. In August 2018 Shergold was appointment Chair of the Joblife Employment Board. In December 2019 Shergold was appointed chair of the New South Wales Education Standards Authority.

Honours
In 1996, Shergold was appointed a Member of the Order of Australia.

In 2007 he was appointed a Companion of the Order, for service to the community as a significant leader of changes and innovation in the public sector, particularly through the development and implementation of a whole-of-government approach to policy development and program delivery.

Shergold was a recipient of the Centenary Medal in 2001.

He was elected a Fellow of the Royal Society of New South Wales in 2016.

References

Further reading

1946 births
Living people
Australian public servants
English emigrants to Australia
Alumni of the University of Hull
University of Illinois Chicago alumni
Alumni of the London School of Economics
Academic staff of the University of New South Wales
Companions of the Order of Australia
Recipients of the Centenary Medal
Secretaries of the Department of the Prime Minister and Cabinet
Secretaries of the Australian Government Education Department
Chancellors of Western Sydney University